Stanley McKenzie (October 6, 1944 – July 21, 2021) was an American professional basketball player in the National Basketball Association (NBA).  Born in Miami, Florida, McKenzie played college basketball at New York University.  He scored over 1,000 points in his collegiate career, and was inducted into the NYU Hall of Fame in 1984.

He was selected by the Baltimore Bullets in the 11th round of the 1966 NBA draft. He played one season with the Bullets, then played for the Phoenix Suns for two years (1968-1970). He next played for the Portland Trail Blazers (1970-1972).  He was traded from the Trail Blazers to the Houston Rockets for Greg Smith on October 27, 1972. He retired from the NBA in 1973.

He was married to Vashti Murphy McKenzie, who became the first woman Bishop in the African Methodist Episcopal Church. Stan McKenzie was also a leader in the AME church, and served as the first male Supervisor of Missions in the AME Church's more than 200-year history. He served as head of missions for three districts, including the 18th, 13th and 10th Episcopal Districts.

References

External links

1944 births
2021 deaths
American expatriate basketball people in Italy
American men's basketball players
Baltimore Bullets (1963–1973) draft picks
Baltimore Bullets (1963–1973) players
Basketball players at the 1967 Pan American Games
Basketball players from Miami
Houston Rockets players
NYU Violets men's basketball players
Pallacanestro Varese players
Pan American Games competitors for the United States
Phoenix Suns expansion draft picks
Phoenix Suns players
Portland Trail Blazers expansion draft picks
Portland Trail Blazers players
Shooting guards
Small forwards
United States men's national basketball team players
1967 FIBA World Championship players